Dowen College is a co-education college located in Lekki, a suburb of Lagos.

The college takes both boarding and day pupils and admits them between the age of 11–18 years. In 2015, the school organised a valedictory service, where outstanding students in their academy performance were rewarded.

The music video for Wizkid's "Holla at Your Boy" was shot at Dowen College.

Death of Sylvester Oromoni
In December 2021, Sylvester Oromoni, a 12-year-old student was alleged to have been bullied and beaten to death by 5 seniors for refusing to join a cult group. According to the deceased father, they also gave him a chemical substance to drink. Upon his death, the Lagos State Government closed the school indefinitely pending outcome of their investigation.

It led to the hashtag #JusticeForSylvesterOromoni trending by many interested parties and concerned citizens. The parent of four of the boys involved are in police custody after they submitted themselves to the police for further investigation.

Notable alumni
Moet Abebe, video jockey, television presenter, actress, and catering exec
Tems, Nigerian Singer

References

Secondary schools in Lagos State
Schools in Lagos